Leslie Bartlett (died 2004) was a butler, toastmaster and founder of the London School of British Butlers. He also was an advisor to the 1995 film The Grotesque.

References

2004 deaths
Year of birth missing
British butlers